Quốc is a Vietnamese given name. Notable people with the name include:

 Nguyễn Quốc Cường (born 1982), Vietnamese politician
 Quốc Thiên (born 1988), Vietnamese singer
 Trần Quốc Khang (1237–1300), Vietnamese prince
 Trần Quốc Tảng (died 1313), Vietnamese general
 Trần Quốc Toản (1267–1285), Vietnamese marquis
 Trần Quốc Tuấn (1228–1300), Vietnamese general

Vietnamese names